Yadunath Sharma, popularly known as Girish Ballabh Joshi (1867–1923) was a Nepali Ayurvedic doctor (kabiraj) and novelist. He is considered to be the first Nepali novelist. His novel Bir Charitra was first published in 1903.

Early life 
He was born on 5 October 1867 (19 Ashoj 1924 BS) to father Ganga Nath and mother Bagishowri. The place of his birth is disputed, some sources claim it was in Kathmandu, while other claims, it was in Varanasi or Mathura city of India. It is believed his parents were on a pilgrimage in India, around his birth. He grew up in Mathura and Varanasi. His family served as the royal Baidhya (Ayurvedic practitioner). He studied Ayurveda in Varanasi. After the death of his father, he returned to Kathmandu.

Literary career 
Although, he had not received any education in literar field, he was interested in literature. He was proficient in Hindi and Urdu alongside Nepali. He was an ardent fan of Devaki Nandan Khatri, an Indian writer. His novels influenced him to write Bir Charitra, a fantasy detective novel.

Bibliography 
Novels

 Bir Charitra (1903)
 Bahadur Charitra 
 Prarabdha Darpan
 Chandrakala Adityasen
 Girishbani (Hindi novel)

Plays

 Sitaram Milap (Hindi)
 Pashupati Sabha
 Satyanag Chitra
 Golokarchitra

Other

 Ishwar Tatva Bibek
 Patanjal Yogsutrako Bhasya (Sanskrit)
 Bibhinna Dev Deviko Stuti Padhya (Sanskrit)

Personal life and death 
He had 13 children (7 daughters and 6 sons). He died in December 1923 (Poush 1980).

References 

Nepalese male novelists
20th-century Nepalese writers
1867 births
1923 deaths
19th-century Nepalese writers